Percy Morris Beard (January 26, 1908 – March 27, 1990) was an American college and international track and field athlete who specialized in the high hurdles event, and won an Olympic silver medal.  Beard later became a nationally prominent college track and field coach at the University of Florida.

Athletic career 

Percy Beard was born in Hardinsburg, Kentucky in 1908.  He became a world-class hurdler at Alabama Polytechnic Institute (now Auburn University) in Auburn, Alabama.  After graduating from Auburn with a bachelor's degree in civil engineering in 1929, he later competed for the New York Athletic Club in Amateur Athletic Union (AAU) competition.  He set a world record of 14.2 seconds in the 120-yard high hurdles in 1931 and tied the record again in 1934.  A seven-time national AAU high hurdles champion, Beard won the silver medal in the 110-meter high hurdles event at the 1932 Summer Olympic Games in Los Angeles, finishing second behind U.S. teammate George Saling.

Coaching career 

Following his competition running career, Beard later became the head coach of the Florida Gators track and field of the University of Florida in Gainesville, Florida, serving from 1937 to 1964.  Under Beard, the Gators won the Southeastern Conference (SEC) outdoor track and field championship twice and were the runners-up four times.  While he was the Gators' head coach, he founded the Florida Relays in 1939, which became one of the country's top collegiate track and field events.  He used his Auburn civil engineering background to develop all-weather running tracks, and unveiled the first full-scale all-weather track at the 1959 Florida Relays.

Legacy and honors 

Beard was a member of the U.S. Track and Field and Cross Country Coaches Association Hall of Fame, and was elected to the United States National Track and Field Hall of Fame in 1981.  The University of Florida honored Beard by naming its track and field facility, Percy Beard Track, for him in 1978.  He was inducted into the University of Florida Athletic Hall of Fame as an "honorary letter winner" in 1976.

Beard died in Gainesville in 1990; he was 82 years old.  He was survived by his wife Sara, and their three sons.

See also 

 Florida Gators
 History of the University of Florida
 List of Auburn University people
 List of Olympic medalists in athletics (men)
 List of University of Florida Olympians
List of University of Florida Athletic Hall of Fame members
 University Athletic Association

References 

1908 births
1990 deaths
People from Hardinsburg, Kentucky
Sportspeople from Kentucky
American male hurdlers
Olympic silver medalists for the United States in track and field
Athletes (track and field) at the 1932 Summer Olympics
Auburn Tigers men's track and field athletes
Florida Gators track and field coaches
Medalists at the 1932 Summer Olympics